Richard Head (c. 1637–1686) was an author and playwright.

Richard Head may also refer to:

Richard Head (footballer) (1887–1940), Australian rules football player
Sir Richard Head, 1st Baronet (c. 1609–1689), MP for Rochester
Sir Richard Head, 3rd Baronet, of the Head baronets
Richard Head, 2nd Viscount Head (born 1937)
Sir Richard Douglas Somerville Head, 6th Baronet (born 1951), of the Head baronets